Leucania diatrecta is a moth of the family Noctuidae. It is found in New South Wales.

The wingspan is about 30 mm.

References

Leucania
Moths described in 1886